The Regiment "Cavalleggeri di Lodi" (15th) ( - "Chevau-légers of Lodi") is a cavalry unit of the Italian Army based in Lecce in Apulia. Today the regiment is the reconnaissance unit of the Mechanized Brigade "Pinerolo".

History

Formation 
After the Second Italian War of Independence the Royal Sardinian Army formed three new Chevau-légers regiments on 16 September 1859: Regiment "Cavalleggeri di Milano", Regiment "Cavalleggeri di Montebello", and Regiment "Cavalleggeri di Lodi". The "Cavalleggeri di Lodi" was formed in Alessandria, with three squadrons transferred from the Regiment "Nizza Cavalleria", Regiment "Cavalleggeri di Saluzzo", and Regiment "Cavalleggeri di Alessandria".

In 1863-64 the regiment operated in the area between Benevento and Oppido Lucano to suppress the anti-Sardinian revolt in Southern Italy after the Kingdom of Sardinia had invaded and annexed the Kingdom of Two Sicilies. In 1866 the regiment participated in the Third Italian War of Independence and in 1870 it participated in the Capture of Rome. Over the next years the regiment repeatedly changed its name:

 10 September 1871: 15th Regiment of Cavalry (Lodi)
 5 November 1876: Cavalry Regiment "Lodi" (15th)
 16 December 1897: Regiment "Cavalleggeri di Lodi" (15th)

In 1887 the regiment contributed to the formation of the 1st Cavalry Squadron Africa and the Mounted Hunters Squadron, which fought in the Italo-Ethiopian War of 1887–1889. In 1895-96 the regiment provided 69 enlisted personnel for units deployed to Italian Eritrea for the First Italo-Ethiopian War. Between its founding and World War I the Alessandria ceded on five occasions one of its squadrons to help form new Chevau-légers regiments:

 16 February 1864: Regiment "Cavalleggeri di Caserta" (17th)
 1 January 1872: Regiment "Cavalleggeri di Roma" (20th)
 1 October 1883: Regiment "Cavalleggeri di Catania" (22nd)
 1 November 1887: Regiment "Cavalleggeri di Vicenza" (24th)
 1 October 1909: Regiment "Cavalleggeri di Udine" (29th)

Italo-Turkish War 
In 1911 the regiment was transferred to Libya for the Italo-Turkish War. There the regiment earned its first of three Silver Medals of Military Valour at the Battle of Bu Meliana and its second Silver Medal two years later, when the regiment charged Libyan rebels at Monterus Nero.

World War I 
At the outbreak of World War I the regiment consisted of a command, the regimental depot, and two cavalry groups, with the I Group consisting of three squadrons and the II Group consisting of two squadrons and a machine gun section. For the entire duration of the war the regiment's 1st Squadron remained on garrison duty in Italian Libya. In February 1916 the remaining squadrons of the I Group, the 2nd and 3rd squadrons, were dismounted and assigned to the Regiment "Lancieri di Novara" (5th) respectively Regiment "Cavalleggeri Guide" (19th) for deployment in the trenches of the Italian Front. In March 1916 the regiment was sent to the Albanian front, where in April 1916 it was joined by dismounted reinforcements. In June 1916 fresh troops trained by the regiment's depot in Naples arrived in Albania and the regiment combined these troops with the horses of the 2nd and 3rd squadrons to form the III Group, which consisted of the 7th and 8th squadrons. In October of the same year the regiment formed a IV Group, which consisted of the 9th and 10th squadrons, with the dismounted personnel it had received earlier that year in April.

In May 1917 the depot formed the dismounted 2nd and 3rd squadrons, which joined the regiment in Albania. In July 1917 the 732nd Dismounted Machine Gunners Company was formed, which served as reinforcement for infantry units on the Italian front. In April 1918 the regiment's III Group was transferred to the Western Front, where the group fought in the Second Battle of the Marne, at Chemin des Dames, in Sissonne, and on the Meuse. Meanwhile the rest of the regiment fought on the Macedonian front. Only in May 1919 the regiment returns to Italy.

Interwar years 
After the war the Italian Army disbanded 14 of its 30 cavalry regiments and so on 21 November 1919 the II Group of the Lodi was renamed "Cavalleggeri di Udine" as it consisted of personnel and horses from the disbanded Regiment "Cavalleggeri di Udine" (29th). On 20 May 1920 the army disbanded four more cavalry regiments and this time also the "Cavalleggeri di Lodi" was disbanded. On the same date the Regiment "Lancieri di Firenze" (9th) moved from Rome to Naples, where it took over the barracks of the Lodi and received and integrated the two remaining squadrons of the "Cavalleggeri di Lodi". The "Lancieri di Firenze" also received the traditions of the "Cavalleggeri di Lodi".

World War II 
On 15 February 1942 the Armored Reconnaissance Grouping "Cavalleggeri di Lodi" (15th) ( (R.E.Co) "Cavalleggeri di Lodi" (15°)) was formed in Pinerolo. The grouping consisted of the following units:

 Armored Reconnaissance Grouping "Cavalleggeri di Lodi" (15th)
 Command Squadron
 I Group
 Command Squadron
 2x tank squadrons, with L6/40 tanks
 Armored Car Squadron, with AB41 armored cars
 Motorcyclists Squadron
 II Group
 Command Squadron
 Self-propelled Squadron, with 47/32 self-propelled guns
 Anti-aircraft Squadron, with 20/65 anti-aircraft guns

On 20 November 1942 the grouping arrived in Tunisia to fight in the Tunisian campaign, where it distinguished itself at Gabès during the Battle of Wadi Akarit and Enfidha during Operation Strike, earning the regiment its third Silver Medal of Military Valour. The grouping surrendered with the rest of Army Group Africa on 13 May 1943.

Cold War 

On 1 January 1952 the Armored Cavalry Squadron "Cavalleggeri di Lodi" was formed in Verona and equipped with M8 Greyhound armored cars and assigned to Armored Division "Centauro" as divisional reconnaissance unit. In September 1956 the squadron was expanded to Squadrons Group "Cavalleggeri di Lodi" and moved from Verona to Novara. In 1964 the squadrons group moved from Novara to Lenta. For its conduct and work after the 1968 Piedmont floods the squadrons group was awarded a Bronze Medal of Civil Merit.

During the 1975 army reform the army disbanded the regimental level and newly independent battalions were granted for the first time their own flags. On 30 October 1975 the squadrons group was renamed 15th Reconnaissance Squadrons Group "Cavalleggeri di Lodi" and assigned the flag and traditions of the Regiment "Cavalleggeri di Lodi" (15th). The squadrons group consisted of a command, a command and services squadron, and three reconnaissance squadrons equipped with Fiat Campagnola reconnaissance vehicles, M113 armored personnel carriers, and M47 Patton tanks. The Lodi continued to be the Armored Division "Centauro"'s reconnaissance unit. In 1980 the Lodi began to replace its M47 Patton tanks with Leopard 1A2 main battle tanks.

In 1983 a platoon of the regiment participated in the Multinational Force in Lebanon: between 17 March and 23 December three troop rotations with in total three officers and 154 troops served in Lebanon and provided the Italian forces with seven CM6616 armored card and 15 trucks.

In 1986 the Italian Army disbanded the divisional level and placed brigades under direct command of its Army Corps. With the Centauro scheduled to disband the 15th Reconnaissance Squadrons Group "Cavalleggeri di Lodi" was reorganized and renamed on 31 July 1986 as 15th Tank Squadrons Group "Cavalleggeri di Lodi". The squadrons group joined the Mechanized Brigade "Brescia" and consisted now of a command, a command and services squadron, and three tank squadrons equipped with Leopard 1A2 main battle tanks.

Recent times 
After the end of the Cold War the Italian Army began to draw down its forces and the Brescia was one of the first brigades to disband. On 27 July 1991 the brigade was deactivated with most of its units, while the Cavalleggeri di Lodi was assigned to the 3rd Army Corps. On 5 September 1991 the 15th Tank Squadrons Group "Cavalleggeri di Lodi" lost its autonomy and the next day the squadrons group entered the newly formed 15th Regiment "Cavalleggeri di Lodi", which on 10 September 1992 was renamed Regiment "Cavalleggeri di Lodi" (15th). The regiment consisted of a command, a command and services squadron, and a squadrons group with three armored squadrons equipped with wheeled Centauro tank destroyers.

On 31 October 1995 the Regiment "Cavalleggeri di Lodi" (15th) was disbanded and its flag transferred on 16 November to the Shrine of the Flags in the Vittoriano in Rome.

2020 reform 
On 10 January 2020 the 31st Tank Regiment of the Mechanized Brigade "Pinerolo" was reformed as a reconnaissance unit and given the name, flag and traditions of the Regiment "Cavalleggeri di Lodi" (15th).

Current structure 
As of 2022 the Regiment "Cavalleggeri di Lodi" (15th) consists of:

  Regimental Command, in Lecce
 Command and Logistic Support Squadron
 1st Reconnaissance Squadrons Group
 1st Reconnaissance Squadron
 2nd Reconnaissance Squadron
 3rd Reconnaissance Squadron
 Heavy Armored Squadron

The Command and Logistic Support Squadron fields the following platoons: C3 Platoon, Transport and Materiel Platoon, Medical Platoon, and Commissariat Platoon. The three reconnaissance squadrons are equipped with VTLM Lince vehicles and Centauro tank destroyers, the latter of which are scheduled to be replaced by Freccia reconnaissance vehicles. The Heavy Armor Squadron is equipped with Centauro tank destroyers, which are being replaced by Centauro II tank destroyers.

See also 
 Mechanized Brigade "Pinerolo"

External links
Italian Army Website: Reggimento "Cavalleggeri di Lodi" (15°)

References

Cavalry Regiments of Italy